Lacey is a city in Thurston County, Washington, United States. It is a suburb of Olympia with a population of 53,526 at the 2020 census. Lacey is located along Interstate 5 between Olympia and the Nisqually River, which marks the border with Pierce County and Joint Base Lewis–McChord.

History
Lacey was originally called Woodland after settlers Isaac and Catherine Wood, who claimed land there in 1853. By 1891, the railroad had come to the community of Woodland and the residents decided it was time to apply for a post office.  The request was denied because there was already a town called Woodland on the Columbia River. The name Lacey was chosen for the new post office application, presumably after O. C. Lacey, a Justice of the Peace in Olympia. The small settlements of Woodland and Chambers Prairie consolidated into Lacey in the 1950s. The city of Lacey was not officially incorporated until 1966. At the time, the main industries were cattle, milk, forest products, and retail. Lacey became a commuter town for Olympia, Fort Lewis and to some extent, Tacoma; in recent years, however, business developments, community groups, and population growth have led Lacey to develop into a city in its own right.

Geography

Demographics

As of 2000 the median income for a household in the city was $46,848, and the median income for a family was $54,923. Males had a median income of $41,053 versus $32,497 for females. The per capita income for the city was $20,224. About 7.1% of families and 8.8% of the population were below the poverty line, including 10.5% of those under age 18 and 5.5% of those age 65 or over.

2010 census
As of the census of 2010, there were 42,393 people, 16,949 households, and 10,869 families residing in the city. The racial makeup of the city was 74.2% White, 5.4% African American, 1.2% Native American, 8.0% Asian, 1.7% Pacific Islander, 2.6% from other races, and 7.0% from two or more races. Hispanic or Latino of any race were 9.2% of the population.

There were 16,949 households, of which 33.9% had children under the age of 18 living with them, 46.7% were married couples living together, 12.9% had a female householder with no husband present, 4.5% had a male householder with no wife present, and 35.9% were non-families. 28.3% of all households were made up of individuals, and 11% had someone living alone who was 65 years of age or older. The average household size was 2.44 and the average family size was 2.99.

The median age in the city was 34 years. 24.6% of residents were under the age of 18; 10.1% were between the ages of 18 and 24; 29.5% were from 25 to 44; 21.8% were from 45 to 64; and 14.1% were 65 years of age or older. The gender makeup of the city was 47.4% male and 52.6% female.

Economy
South Sound Center is a shopping mall in Lacey.

Sustainability
Lacey was the twelfth city to be designated an official "Green Power Community" by the U.S. Environmental Protection Agency for its use of renewable energy sources; 5% of its total energy use comes from green power sources. It is working to meet its Alternative Energy Initiative, which includes using 100 percent green electrical energy in all of its municipal buildings, parks, utilities, and 3,000 streetlights and traffic signals; providing electric vehicle charging stations to visitors and employees at its city hall and library campus; and initiating conversion of its municipal fleet to energy efficient vehicles powered by electricity, hybrid technology, and 80/20 biofuel. Lacey has received the "Tree City, USA" designation from the National Arbor Day Foundation for twenty six years.

Education
In addition to being the home of many public and private schools, Lacey is also home to Saint Martin's University, Charter College and Thurston County's largest school district, North Thurston Public Schools. Lacey is also home to various faith based schools, such as Holy Family School (Roman Catholic Preschool through 8th grade),  Faith Lutheran School (Preschool through 8th Grade) and Foundation Campus, which includes Community Christian Academy (Pre-school to Middle School) and Northwest Christian High School. Lacey is also the home of Pope John Paul II High School.

Public secondary schools

 Aspire Middle School (Magnet)
 Chinook Middle School
 Komachin Middle School
 Nisqually Middle School
 Salish Middle School
 North Thurston High School
 River Ridge High School
 Timberline High School 
 South Sound High School (Alternative High School, Closed as of 2021)

Notable people
 USA Soccer Goalkeeper Kasey Keller grew up on an egg farm in Lacey; graduating from North Thurston High School in 1988.  A street that is adjacent to the high school is named after him.
 NFL Carolina Panthers Running Back Jonathan Stewart graduated from Timberline High School in 2005. He attended The University of Oregon, and was drafted by the Carolina Panthers in the first round of the 2008 NFL Draft, as the 13th pick overall.
 NFL Washington Redskins (now known as the Commanders) Pro Bowl Fullback Mike Sellers graduated from North Thurston High School, and returned to Lacey in the off-season during his playing days.
 NFL Tampa Bay Buccaneers Tight End Jerramy Stevens graduated from River Ridge High School. He was selected as the 28th overall pick in the 2002 NFL Draft by the Seattle Seahawks.
 MMA fighter Brad Blackburn graduated from Timberline High School in Lacey.
 Former NFL Defensive End Ron Holmes graduated from Timberline High School.
 Seattle Mayor Ed Murray graduated from Timberline High School in 1973.
 Buford O. Furrow, perpetrator of the 1999 Los Angeles Jewish Community Center shooting.
 Kyla Coleman, winner of America's Next Top Model (Cycle 24, 2018).

Sister city
Lacey has a sister city in Poland, Mińsk Mazowiecki.

References

External links

 City of Lacey
 Lacey-Thurston County Chamber of Commerce

 
Cities in Washington (state)
Cities in Thurston County, Washington